Hygiene programs are ways of providing basic hygiene facilities to people experiencing homelessness. Some are stand-alone hygiene centers while others are at locations that also provide additional kinds of services. They are one of the more modern responses to addressing homelessness, especially compared to things like basic homeless shelters that just provide a bed and toilet for the night, or soup kitchens, which traditionally have not even had places for patrons to wash their hands.

At a minimum, they have a toilet, wash basin, and a shower. But many have other amenities, such as a mirror to assist with shaving and applying cosmetics, a diaper-changing station, electric outlets for appliances such as irons, private dressing stalls, hygiene supplies such as soap and toothpaste, tampons, pads, condoms, and/or laundry facilities.

Public support of hygiene programs have been growing, due in part to the realization that, besides basic humanitarian reasons, such facilities offer people experiencing homelessness an alternative to using restrooms in libraries and other public buildings.

References

Homelessness solutions
Hygiene